David Fenton (born 1953) is the Chairman and founder of Fenton Communications, created in 1982 to promote issue-oriented public relations campaigns focusing on the environment, public health and human rights. Since founding the company, he pioneered the use of professional P.R. and advertising techniques by nonprofit public interest groups in the United States and around the world. The company has offices in New York, Washington, San Francisco and Los Angeles.

Fenton also co-founded three independent nonprofit organizations: Environmental Media Services, which coordinated communications activities for environmental groups; New Economy Communications, which works on human rights issues in the global economy; and Death Penalty Information Center, which helps journalists cover evidence of innocence and racial bias in the death penalty.  He also helped incubate Climate Nexus, which works with journalists on climate change, and J Street, the pro-Israel, pro-peace group working for a two-state solution.

Fenton was formerly director of Public Relations at Rolling Stone magazine in 1978. He was co-producer of the "No Nukes" concerts with Jackson Browne, Bruce Springsteen, Bonnie Raitt, James Taylor and many others in New York City, 1979. In the late 1960s, he was a photojournalist, for Liberation News Service while also publishing in the NY Times, Life, Newsweek and others. His book of photographs SHOTS: An American Photographer's Journey was published in 2005. Published on November 1, 2022, Bob's book "The Activist’s Media Handbook" discusses how to organize social media campaigns.  

Fenton is a native of New York City. He and his wife divide their time between New York and Berkeley.

References

External links 
 Company website

Living people
Businesspeople from New York City
American public relations people
1953 births